Nifty Numbers is a 1928 2-reel short film subject from Al Christie Studios. It is part a series called Confessions of a Chorus Girl. Nifty Numbers is the fourth installment in this series. The 5th and 6th installments were called Footlight Fanny(1929) and Tight Places(1929) respectively.

Prints of the film are privately held.

Cast
Frances Lee - Doris
Billy Engle - Mr. Knit
Jimmie Hertz - partner to Mr. Knit
Eddie Barry - J.R. Stern

uncredited
Aileen Carlyle
Cliff Lancaster
Margaret Lee
Georgia O'Dell

References

External links
Nifty Numbers at IMDb.com
lobby poster

1928 films
American silent short films
American black-and-white films
1920s American films